Agapios Salomon Naoum, BS (1 August 1882 – 1 May 1967) was Archbishop of the Melkite Greek Catholic Archeparchy of Tyre in Lebanon.

Life

Agapios Naoum was ordained on 8 September 1907 Chaplain of the Melkite Basilian of the Most Holy Redeemer. On 3 November 1933, he was appointed as successor to Archbishop Maximos IV Sayegh to the see of Tyre and on 3 December 1933, by Patriarch Cyril IX Moghabghab was ordained bishop. On 15 October 1965 he resigned his duties as archeparch and with simultaneous appointment as Titular Archbishop of Tarsus of Greek Melkites he became Professor Emeritus until his death on 1 May 1967. Naoum was succeeded by Archbishop Georges Haddad.

References

External links
 http://www.catholic-hierarchy.org/bishop/bnao.html
 http://www.gcatholic.org/dioceses/diocese/tyrz0.htm

1882 births
1967 deaths
Lebanese Melkite Greek Catholics
Melkite Greek Catholic bishops